Munds is a surname. Notable people with the surname include:

Arthur Munds (1870−1940), English cricketer
Frances Munds (1866–1948), American suffragist
Raymond Munds (1882–1962), English cricketer, brother of Arthur